WXYX (100.7 FM), branded on-air as La X, is a radio station broadcasting a Top 40/CHR format. Licensed to Bayamon, Puerto Rico, it serves the Puerto Rico area. The station is currently owned by Raad Broadcasting Corporation.

The station is relayed through booster stations, WXYX-FM1 in Juana Diaz and WXYX-FM2 in Ceiba, both operating at 100.7 FM.

External links

 Video blog from the station

XYX
Radio stations established in 1964
Bayamón, Puerto Rico
1964 establishments in Puerto Rico